The Men's giant slalom competition of the Sarajevo 1984 Olympics was held at Bjelašnica.

The defending world champion was Steve Mahre of the United States, while his brother, Phil Mahre, was the defending World Cup giant slalom champion and Switzerland's Pirmin Zurbriggen was leader of the 1984 World Cup.

Results

References 

Men's giant slalom